Maria Guadalupe Godínez (born September 6, 1993) is a Mexican female mixed martial artist who competes in the Strawweight division of the Ultimate Fighting Championship.

Background
At the age of 14, Godínez's father Carlos was approached by the cartel who demanded protection money. After he found a lot full of bullet-riddled cars and shattered windows, and answered phone calls with voices telling him his daughters’ names and schools, Carlos decided to take his family and leave. Telling his family that they were leaving for Disneyland, instead they landed in Vancouver, where they had to start from scratch. They lived out of a hotel for six months, and did odd jobs such as washing cars to pay the bills. After life stabilized, Godínez was encouraged by her boyfriend to get back into judo that she had done since childhood, and then into jiu-jitsu.

Godínez has three younger sisters, of whom two – Karla and Ana – are accomplished wrestlers competing with the Canadian national team.

Mixed martial arts career

Early career
Godínez began her MMA career as an amateur in 2016. Her debut match was held on June 18, 2016, and it was against Ali Cranmer. She won the match via decision. However, the winning happiness was crushed when she lost against Jamey-Lyn Horth Wessels on two different occasions, on November 25, 2016, and February 18, 2017, respectively.

Despite two straight losses, she bounced back and won her next two bouts against Ashlee Jarvis and Kyla Frajman. Her winning streak was stopped once again when she faced Tiffany Conama and Morgan Engelhardt, respectively.

In her next two matches, she showed what she could as she defeated Alexandra Lucia Delgado-Lopez and Sam Hughes. When she won against Sam Hughes, she also captured the COGA Strawweight Championship. After that, she decided to turn professional.

On June 30, 2018, Godínez made her professional MMA debut when she faced Jennah Macallister—she won the bout via a unanimous decision. After that, she never faced any loss and drew as she defeated Ashlee Mastin and Felisha Magallan

She also managed to capture the vacant BTC Strawweight Championship defeating Lindsay Garbatt at BTC 8 on November 30, 2019. In the next bout at LFA 94, Godinez captured the LFA Women's Strawweight Championship, defeating Vanessa Demopoulos via majority decision.

Ultimate Fighting Championship
Godínez, as a replacement for Hannah Goldy faced Jessica Penne UFC on ESPN: Whittaker vs. Gastelum on  April 17, 2021. Godinez lost the close bout via split decision. 11 out of 17 media scores gave it to Godínez.

Godínez, as a replacement for Stephanie Egger, was expected to face Sarah Alpar on May 22, 2021 on UFC Fight Night: Font vs. Garbrandt. The bout was scrapped completely a day later as Godínez wasn't able to get her visa in time.

Godínez was expected to face Sam Hughes on October 8, 2021 at UFC Fight Night: Dern vs. Rodriguez. However, Hughes was pulled from the bout after testing positive for COVID-19 and was replaced by promotional newcomer Silvana Gómez Juárez. She won the bout via armbar in the first round. This fight earned her the Performance of the Night award.

On a one week turnaround, Godínez, as a replacement for Sijara Eubanks, faced Luana Carolina on October 16, 2021 at UFC Fight Night: Ladd vs. Dumont. With this bout, she earned the record for the fastest turnaround in modern UFC history at just seven days. She lost the fight via unanimous decision.

Godínez, replacing Cheyanne Buys, faced Loma Lookboonmee on November 20, 2021 at UFC Fight Night 198. She won the bout via unanimous decision.

Godínez faced Ariane Carnelossi on May 7, 2022 at UFC 274. She won the fight via unanimous decision.

Godínez faced Angela Hill on August 13, 2022 at UFC on ESPN: Vera vs. Cruz. She lost the fight via unanimous decision.

Godinez is scheduled to face Cynthia Calvillo on April 8, 2023 at UFC 287.

Championships and achievements 
 Legacy Fighting Alliance (LFA)
 LFA Women's Strawweight Champion (one time; former)
BTC Fight Promotions
 BTC Strawweight Championship (One time)
Ultimate Fighting Championship
Performance of the Night (One time) 
Record for fastest turnaround in Modern UFC history (7 days)
Record for shortest span between three fights in Modern UFC history (42 days)

Mixed martial arts record

|-
|Loss
|align=center|8–3
|Angela Hill
|Decision (unanimous)
|UFC on ESPN: Vera vs. Cruz
|
|align=center|3
|align=center|5:00
|San Diego, California, United States
|
|-
|Win
|align=center|8–2
|Ariane Carnelossi
|Decision (unanimous)
|UFC 274
|
|align=center|3
|align=center|5:00
|Phoenix, Arizona, United States
|
|-
|Win
|align=center|7–2
|Loma Lookboonmee
|Decision (unanimous)
|UFC Fight Night: Vieira vs. Tate
|
|align=center|3
|align=center|5:00
|Las Vegas, Nevada, United States
|
|-
|Loss
|align=center|6–2
|Luana Carolina
|Decision (unanimous)
|UFC Fight Night: Ladd vs. Dumont
|
|align=center|3
|align=center|5:00
|Las Vegas, Nevada, United States
|
|-
| Win
| align=center|6–1
|Silvana Gómez Juárez
|Submission (armbar)
|UFC Fight Night: Dern vs. Rodriguez
|
|align=center|1
|align=center|4:14
|Las Vegas, Nevada, United States
| 
|-
| Loss
| align=center|5–1
|Jessica Penne
|Decision (split)
|UFC on ESPN: Whittaker vs. Gastelum
|
|align=center|3
|align=center|5:00
|Las Vegas, Nevada, United States
|
|-
| Win
| align=center|5–0
| Vanessa Demopoulos
| Decision (majority)
| LFA 94
| 
| align=center| 5
| align=center| 5:00
| Park City, Kansas, United States
| 
|-
| Win
| align=center| 4–0
| Lindsay Garbatt
|Decision (unanimous)
|BTC 8: Eliminator
|
|align=center|5
|align=center|5:00
|Niagara Falls, Ontario, Canada
|
|-
| Win
| align=center|3–0
| Felisha Magallan
|Decision (unanimous)
|Combate 42: Tahoe
|
| align=center|3
| align=center|5:00
|Lake Tahoe, Nevada, United States
|
|-
| Win
| align=center| 2–0
| Ashlee Mastin
| TKO (submission to punches)
|SCL: Fight Night
|
| align=center|1
| align=center|2:19
|Golden, Colorado, United States
|
|-
| Win
| align=center|1–0
| Jennah Macallister
| Decision (unanimous)
| SCL: Army vs Marines 9
| 
| align=center| 3
| align=center| 5:00
| Denver, Colorado, United States
|

See also 
 List of current UFC fighters
 List of female mixed martial artists

References

External links 
  
 

1993 births
Living people
Mexican female mixed martial artists
Strawweight mixed martial artists
Mixed martial artists utilizing judo
Mixed martial artists utilizing Brazilian jiu-jitsu
Ultimate Fighting Championship female fighters
Mexican practitioners of Brazilian jiu-jitsu
Female Brazilian jiu-jitsu practitioners
Mexican female judoka